Magnus Kaastrup Refstrup Lauritsen (born 28 December 2000) is a Danish professional footballer who plays as winger for Danish Superliga club Lyngby Boldklub.

Career

AGF
Kaastrup joined AGF in the summer 2013 from Virring SSV as a U-14 player. On 1 January 2016, he signed a youth contract with the club.

In January 2017, Kaastrup joined the first team squad on their training camp in Portugal. He made his official first team debut on 14 July 2017, in a game against AC Horsens, replacing Jakob Ankersen with 15 minutes to go. He became the youngest ever debutant for the club at the age of 16 years and 198 days. On 28 March 2018, Kaastrup signed a full-time contract with AGF with expiration at the end of 2020.

On 27 May 2019, AGF announced that they had loaned out Kaastrup to the reserve team of Dortmund, Borussia Dortmund II, from the upcoming 2019–20 season, being reunited with his former manager Mike Tullberg.

On 5 October 2020, Kaastrup was loaned out again, this time to Danish 1st Division club Viborg FF for the rest of 2020. He made his debut on 16 October, coming off the bench as a late substitute in a 3–1 victory against Fremad Amager. He made 10 appearances for the club, in which he scored one goal and provided two assists.

Lyngby
On transfer deadline day, 1 February 2021, Kaastrup joined Lyngby Boldklub on a deal until June 2023. His debut came on 7 February in a 1–0 away league defeat to his former club AGF, where he came on as a substitute in the 62nd minute for Emil Nielsen. He made his first start in his third game for the club, a 2–2 home draw against FC Copenhagen. He suffered relegation to the Danish 1st Division with the club on 9 May after a loss to last placed AC Horsens.

He had a strong start to the 2021–22 season, recording three goals and three assists in the first six league games. On 23 October, he scored the winner in a 1–0 victory against AC Horsens, lifting Lyngby to the top of the league table. On 2 April 2022, Kaastrup scored a hat-trick in a 5–0 win against Nykøbing to draw his club closer to promotion, which was achieved on 23 May.

Career statistics

References

External links
Magnus Kaastrup at DBU

2000 births
Living people
Danish men's footballers
Danish expatriate men's footballers
Danish Superliga players
Regionalliga players
Aarhus Gymnastikforening players
Borussia Dortmund II players
Viborg FF players
Lyngby Boldklub players
Association football forwards
Denmark youth international footballers
Danish expatriate sportspeople in Germany
Expatriate footballers in Germany
Danish 1st Division players
People from Skanderborg Municipality
Sportspeople from the Central Denmark Region